The Memorial to Nordic Volunteers and Fallen (Danish: Mindesmærke for Frivillige og Faldne), located on Smedelinien, part of Kastellet, is a memorial to 28 Norwegian, Swedish and Finnish volunteers of the First (1848–50) and Second Schleswig War (1864). It was inaugurated in 1920 to design by Anders Bundgaard.

Description
The memorial is designed as a symbolic burial chamber. At its entrance stands a female figure holding a standard and a spear. The plinth features the coats of arms of Norway, Sweden and Finland..

History

The memorial was created at the initiative of Danmarks-Samfundet  through a nationwide fundraising campaign in connection with the reunion of Sønderjylland with Denmark. The society's application to the city was for a memorial on top of the former Pückler's Bastion in Østre Anlæg but that site was instead used for a new setting for the Denmark Monument. Anders Bundgaard was charged with designing the monument. It was unveiled in 1920.

References

Monuments and memorials in Copenhagen
Sculptures by Anders Bundgaard
Danish military memorials and cemeteries
1920 establishments in Denmark
Schleswig Wars